The Crowley Rice Birds were a Minor League Baseball team based in Crowley, Louisiana, that played in the Gulf Coast League in 1908.

References

Rice Birds
Baseball teams established in 1908
Defunct minor league baseball teams
Professional baseball teams in Louisiana
1908 establishments in Louisiana
Defunct baseball teams in Louisiana